Coccothrinax alta (palma plateada, palma de abanico, Tyre palm) is a palm which is native to Puerto Rico and the Virgin Islands.  Like other members of the genus, C. alta is a fan palm.  Trees are 2–6 m tall, with some individuals getting up to 11 m.  Flowers are light yellow, and fruit are purple-black when ripe.  It is found on lower elevations, but to 350 m above sea level.

It is found on limestone substrates in northern Puerto Rico, and on volcanic substrates on the islands off eastern Puerto Rico.  It has been recorded from Puerto Rico proper, Vieques and Culebra; Saint Croix, St. Thomas and St. John in the U.S. Virgin Islands; and Guana Island, Tortola and Virgin Gorda in the British Virgin Islands.

George Proctor (in Acevedo-Rodríguez & Strong, 2005) considers this to be a valid species on the basis of its shorter, more slender trunk, fewer stamens and much smaller fruit.  Rafaël Govaerts follows Read (1979) and considers it a synonym of Coccothrinax barbadensis.

References

alta
Trees of Puerto Rico
Trees of the Virgin Islands
Plants described in 1901
Taxa named by Odoardo Beccari